The Fred J. Hume Award is an annual award presented to the player deemed to be the most "unsung hero" for the Vancouver Canucks of the National Hockey League (NHL). It is voted by the fans and presented at the Canucks' the last home game of the regular season. The current holder of the award is defenceman Luke Schenn, who won it in the 2021–22 NHL season.

History
The Fred J. Hume Award was first presented after the Canucks' inaugural season in 1970–71 and was named after former Mayor of Vancouver Fred J. Hume, who was also owner of the Canucks while they were in the Western Hockey League and an active campaigner to bring the NHL to Vancouver. Prior to being decided by a fan vote, the award was decided on by the Vancouver Canucks Booster Club before the organization dissolved in the 2000s.

The most any Canucks player has won the award is three times, accomplished by Jannik Hansen (2011, 2013, and 2016).

List of winners

 Player is still active with the Canucks.

See also
Babe Pratt Trophy
Cyclone Taylor Trophy
Cyrus H. McLean Trophy
Molson Cup
Pavel Bure Most Exciting Player Award

External links
 Official Canucks Award Winner Archive on Canucks.com
 Canucks Award Winner Archive

References

Vancouver Canucks trophies and awards